Khujehlar may refer to:
 Khujehlar, Kalaleh
 Khujehlar, Pishkamar